María Domínguez may refer to:

 María Domínguez Castellano (born 1965), Spanish neuroscientist 
 María Domínguez Remón (1882–1936), Spanish journalist, poet, republican socialist politician
 María Hilaria Domínguez (born 1953), Mexican politician 
 María Magdalena Domínguez (1922–2021), Spanish poet